James Milne (born 2 December 1961) is a New Zealand cricketer. He played in eight first-class matches for Wellington from 1985 to 1988.

See also
 List of Wellington representative cricketers

References

External links
 

1961 births
Living people
New Zealand cricketers
Wellington cricketers
Cricketers from Wellington City